Syed Abdullah shah, popularly known as Hazrat Hajji Bahadar Kohati, Sufi saint of Kohat, was born on July 31, 1581, AD, in Agra (India) during the reign of Mughal Emperor Shah Jahan.

History
Hajji Bahadar was the son of Syed Shah Muhammad Sultan, and his lineage traces to Imam Hussain. His real name was Syed Abdullah Shah as founded in many books about his life. He belonged to the Sadat family in Agra who were migrated to Agra when Babur invaded India. The tribe of Kheshgi along with many tribes also migrated from Afghanistan to India. Some parts of this tribe (Kheshgi) remain settled in India in the Agra while some return to Pukhtun area of Khyber Pakhtunkhwa. Some of the descendants of this tribe still living in the district of Nowshera under the same name of Kheshgi and still there the family of Sadat who originally was the descendants of Haji Bahadur. During his life, he visited the same area of Kheshgi and afterward went to the district of Kohat through the mountains of Nizampur (Nowshera) Hajji Bahadar went to Bangor at the age of 17 for ‘baet’(Historical fallacy. As per Manaqib Haji Bahadar, authored by one Muhammad Darwesh Tareen, of Lahore on page 3 to have conducted baet with Adam Khan Mashwani at the age of 17. For a while go back to the dates of birth of both the Sufis. Adam Khan Ashwani was born 999 Hijra and Haji Bahadar was born in  984 Hijra. In some books, its stated to be 989Hijra. when the event is narrated, the Hijra year comes to be 1001 Hijra. At that time Adam Khan's age is only two years or according to other date of birth of Haji Bahadar comes to be seven-year. It is absurd to believe that such a young child can cope with such a heavy and responsible duty of Murshidiat. In the history of Sufism, there is not a single example or instance. According to family record Haji Bahadar  had put his hands(baet)upon Shah Badruddin alias Shah Bulaq of Deccan (India) and remained there for three years and left for Hajj via Surat( a seaport in India) of Adam Khan Mashwani, resident of Bangor(Patiala State India(Indian Punjab as nowadays known), where he remained for 11 years. Hajji Bahadar performed Hajj in 1645 AD for the first time, and for the second with his murshid (spiritual teacher), Syed Adam Bangor. In 1657 AD, Syed Adam Banoor and 400 followers reached the Holy land to perform Hajj, remaining in Medina (Saudi Arabia). He returned to Kohat on the advice of his Murshid to spread Islam. Mughal Emperor, Aurangzaib Alamgeer had also ‘baet’ on the hands of Hajji Bahadar Kohli.

Hajji Bahadar died in 1691( I am unable to calculate and convert the Gregorian Calendar into Hijra, however, I presume it to be wrong. The death year of Haji Bahadar is 1070 Hijra and not 1090Hijra as all the historical books stress on this, at the age of 110 years( 1070-984=96 year (and was buried in Kohat. A large number of people from across the country visit his tomb on urs (the anniversary of his death) every year. Hajji Bahadar left five sons behind, (1)Syed Muhammad Yousuf,(2) Syed Muhammad Qasim,(3)Syed Muhammad Omar,
(4) Syed Muhammad Usman,(5) Syed Muhammad Yaqoob.

comments:

References

Indian Sufis